Josep Prat was a Catalan anarchist writer and theoretician of syndicalism. He translated titles including Enrique Leone's El sindicalismo and Luis Fabbri's Anarquismo y socialismo.

References

Further reading 

 

1860s births
1932 deaths
People from Barcelona
Anarchists from Catalonia
Syndicalists
Anarchist writers